Radnor is an unincorporated community in Madison Township, Carroll County, Indiana. It is part of the Lafayette, Indiana Metropolitan Statistical Area.

History
A post office was established at Radnor in 1883, and remained in operation until it was discontinued in 1975. It may be named after Radnor, Pennsylvania.

Geography

References

Unincorporated communities in Carroll County, Indiana
Unincorporated communities in Indiana
Lafayette metropolitan area, Indiana